"Ég er kominn heim" is a song performed by the Icelandic singer Óðinn Valdimarsson and the band K.K. sextettinn. The song is originally by Hungarian composer Emmerich Kálmán and the lyrics were written by Jón Sigurðsson. It was released in 1960 on the album Óðinn. The song gained a resurgence after being covered by Björgvin Halldórsson on his 2003 album Íslandslög 6. In 2008, the song was covered by Bubbi Morthens and Björn Jörundur Friðbjörnsson. By the 2010s, the song had become an unofficial song of the Icelandic national teams, being performed noticeably during the 2015 EuroBasket, the 2016 European Men's Handball Championship, UEFA Euro 2016 and the 2018 FIFA World Cup.

References

1960 singles
1960 songs
Icelandic songs
Icelandic-language songs